Edward Wild, also known as Ed Wild, is a British neurologist and neuroscientist in the field of Huntington's disease and advocate for scientific outreach to the public. He co-founded the Huntington's research news platform HDBuzz in 2010. He is a professor of neurology at UCL Institute of Neurology and is an associate director of the UCL Huntington's Disease Centre. He is also a consultant neurologist at the National Hospital for Neurology and Neurosurgery in London.

Career

Wild studied medicine at Christ's College, Cambridge. In his early career he studied and published on the neurological phenomenon of déjà vu. He undertook a PhD, supervised by professor Sarah Tabrizi, at the UCL Institute of Neurology, Queen Square, London, during which he published research on biomarkers for Huntington's disease using magnetic resonance imaging measures of brain atrophy and biochemical analysis of blood. Wild and Tabrizi continue to work together at the UCL Huntington's Disease Centre.

Wild and colleagues described a novel pathogenic pathway of immune activation in Huntington's which later became the basis of clinical trials of immune-targeted therapies. In 2015 he published the first successful detection and quantification of mutant huntingtin protein (the known cause of Huntington's) in human cerebrospinal fluid, using a novel 'single-molecule counting' immunoassay. This finding was noted as a 'research highlight' by Nature Reviews Neurology and won Wild the Huntington Study group 'Insight of the Year' award in 2015. He has also published novel genetic causes of 'phenocopy' syndromes that mimic Huntington's disease.

Wild's research since 2017 has focused on the potential of neurofilament light and mutant huntingtin protein as biomarkers for Huntington's disease onset and progression. His work has shown that NFL has better prognostic value in Huntington's disease but that mutant huntingtin might be a valuable marker for early and sensitive detection of change in clinical huntingtin-lowering trials. He was a senior investigator in the clinical programme studying the antisense oligonucleotide tominersen to lower mutant huntingtin production in HD, and gave the first dose of the drug to a patient in 2015.

He serves on the Medical Advisory Panel of the UK Huntington's Disease Association, the Editorial Board of the Journal of Huntington's Disease, the Association of British Neurologists Neurogenetics Advisory Panel, and the Translational Neurology Panel of the European Academy of Neurology. He is a member of the Executive Committee of the European Huntington's Disease Network and Co-lead facilitator of the Network’s Biomarkers Working Group. He is a founder member of the advisory panel to the UK All-Party Parliamentary Group on Huntington's disease.

He was promoted to professor of neurology in October 2020, in the UCL Faculty of Brain Sciences. As of September 2022, Wild has authored 7 book chapters and 150 peer-reviewed publications with over 12,000 citations.

Public engagement work
In 2010, with Jeff Carroll, Wild founded HDBuzz, an online source of accessible news about Huntington's disease research, which has received awards from patient advocacy groups. He said he helped establish HDBuzz to provide tempered research news to counter the hype of medical press releases about HD. He has commented that common  online opinions that people with Huntington's disease should not be allowed to have children "borders on historical eugenics-type thinking". He has described Huntington's as "the most curable incurable brain disorder" because of the possibility of targeting treatments to its known genetic cause.

Wild appeared in the documentary feature film The Inheritance and was a judge for the 2015 British Library / Europe PubMed Central 'Access to Understanding' contest for science writers. He has appeared on the BBC Radio Naked Scientists programme. In July 2016 he appeared on BBC Radio 4's Woman's Hour programme talking about Huntington's disease with Jenni Murray. In December 2017 he appeared on RTE Radio 1 talking about Huntington's disease treatments. In 2020 he appeared in the Ken Burns PBS documentary The Gene: An Intimate History.

In 2021 he wrote the afterword of Patient 1, a book by Charlotte Raven about her experiences of Huntington's disease including her participation on the trial of the experimental drug tominersen. Wild is Raven's doctor and injected her with the first dose of tominersen on the Gen-Peak trial.

Personal life
Wild lives in East London with his partner Joel. They have a cat and a chihuahua, Riley.

Awards and honours
 2012 Huntington Society of Canada Community Leadership Award
 2014 Huntington's Disease Society of America Researcher of the Year Award.
 2015 Huntington Study Group Insight of the Year (for his CSF mutant huntingtin research).
 2017 Huntington Study Group Insight of the Year (for the finding that neurofilament light in blood can predict onset and progression of HD).
 2018 Elected Fellow of the Royal College of Physicians.

References

External links
 
 HDBuzz, Wild's Huntington's disease research news site
 Edward Wild Consultant profile at University College London Hospitals NHS Foundation Trust
 Dr Edward Wild IRIS academic profile at UCL
 Google Scholar Profile

British neurologists
British neuroscientists
Huntington's disease
Alumni of University College London
University College London Hospitals NHS Foundation Trust
Academics of University College London
Living people
1978 births
Alumni of Christ's College, Cambridge